Sayköy is a village in Tarsus district of Mersin Province, Turkey. At  it is situated in Çukurova (Cilicia of the antiquity). Çukurova Motorway is to the north and Turkish state highway  is to the south of the village. The population of the village was 455  as of 2012. It is a typical Çukurova village. cotton and fresh vegetables being the main crops.

References

Villages in Tarsus District